Habromyia is a genus of around 3 Neotropical hoverflies.

Species
H. coeruleithorax Williston, 1888
H. ochracea Hull, 1941
H. langi Curran, 1934

References

Diptera of South America
Eristalinae
Hoverfly genera
Taxa named by Samuel Wendell Williston